The Tenth Insight: Holding the Vision is the second novel in the Celestine Series, beginning with The Celestine Prophecy, by James Redfield. It was published in 1996.

Plot summary

One of the characters of The Celestine Prophecy disappears while exploring a forest in the Appalachian Mountains. The book discusses ideas about other dimensions, past lives, conception and birth, the passage through death to an afterlife, hell and heaven. It also illustrates the author's vision of human destiny and the notion that fear of the future is endangering Earth's spiritual renaissance.

In the story, each individual soul is part of a larger "Soul Group", which shares the mission of helping the evolution of the cosmos. At times, a soul from a given Group incarnates itself, choosing the conditions of its life according to its needs, while the other souls observe. Each soul creates a reality around itself, which later brings consequences upon it. These consequences take the form of life and afterlife, which vary according to the person's choices.

On Earth, people speak of the prophecy written in the Book of Revelation as if it were coming true. Many fear that it will come partly true, in that a dictator (an Antichrist) will arise, but will not be thrown down. To counteract this idea, which is damaging to the spiritual renaissance, the protagonists hold their own, Utopian "World Vision" to the exclusion of its opposite, until it dominates the opposite at the book's climax.

All of these ideas are experienced as if real by the characters.

Characters
 John Woodson
 The main character. John goes to the Appalachians to find his friend Charlene, but discovers a lot more comprising the status quo than her disappearance.
 Charlene Billings
 John's old girlfriend, who vanishes in pursuit of the Tenth (Celestine) Insight.
 Joel Lipscomb
 The reporter John meets, who represents the fear.
 Wilson James (Wil)
 A friend encountered in The Celestine Prophecy.
 David Lone Eagle
 A tribesman whom John meets in the beginning of the story. He tells John to be more aware of the visions.
 Maya Ponder
 A medicine woman.
 Feyman Carter
 The man building the threatening machinery that embodies the actions of those who fear the future.
 Curtis Webber/Farell
 Friend of David's. Created part of the said machinery.
 John Donald Williams
 The spirit that John sees when with Wil, in the afterlife. John finds out later that he is a friend to Curtis.

Major themes
Like the Celestine Prophecy, the Tenth Insight discusses Redfield's spiritual beliefs and techniques that will assist in solving problems in the world.  It contains instructions on how we can fulfil our purpose in the world, by re-claiming a birth vision that is a guide in our lives, and helps us to remember a common world vision that will assist us in working together to create a spiritual culture.

References
The Tenth Insight: Holding the Vision (1996) 

1996 American novels
American thriller novels
Sequel novels
Visionary fiction